Amphisbaena carli is a species of worm lizard in the family Amphisbaenidae. The species is endemic to Brazil.

Etymology
The specific name, carli, is in honor of American herpetologist Carl Gans.

Habitat
The preferred habitat of A. carli is forest. The holotype was collected in an area that had been recently deforested and replanted with pines.

Description
A. carli is uniformly pink, both dorsally and ventrally.

References

Further reading
Pinna, Pedro H.; Mendonça, André F.; Bocchiglieri, Adriana; Fernandes, Daniel S. (2010). "A new two-pored Amphisbaena Linnaeus from the endangered Brazilian Cerrado biome (Squamata: Amphisbaenidae)". Zootaxa 2569: 44–54. (Amphisbaena carli, new species). (in English, with an abstract in Portuguese).

carli
Endemic fauna of Brazil
Reptiles of Brazil
Reptiles described in 2010
Taxa named by Pedro H. Pinna
Taxa named by Andre F. Mendonca
Taxa named by Adriana Bocchiglieri
Taxa named by Daniel S. Fernandes